Darius Regelskis (born 15 April 1976) is a Lithuanian professional footballer. He was playing the position of defender and is 1.78 m tall and weighs 71 kg. Regelskis spent the prime years of his career playing for FBK Kaunas. He is a former member of the Lithuania national football team.

Honours
National Team
 Baltic Cup
 2005

External links
 

1976 births
Living people
FCI Levadia Tallinn players
FK Atlantas players
FBK Kaunas footballers
Expatriate footballers in Estonia
Lithuanian footballers
Lithuanian expatriate footballers
Lithuania international footballers
Association football defenders
Lithuanian expatriate sportspeople in Estonia
Meistriliiga players